Dibutyl sebacate (DBS) is an organic chemical, a dibutyl ester of sebacic acid. Its main use is as a plasticizer in production of plastics, namely cellulose acetate butyrate, cellulose acetate propionate, ethyl cellulose, polyvinyl butyral, polyvinyl chloride, polystyrene, and many synthetic rubbers (especially nitrile rubber and neoprene) and other plastics. It can be used for plastics in use in the food packaging industry, in plastics used for medical devices, and for pharmaceutical applications, e.g. as a plasticizer for film coating of tablets, beads, and granules. It is also used as a lubricant in shaving lotions, and a flavoring additive in non-alcoholic beverages, ice cream, ices, candy, and baked goods. It provides excellent compatibility with a range of plastic materials, superior properties at low temperatures, and good oil resistivity. Its other names include Morflex, Kodaflex, polycizer, Proviplast 1944 and PX 404. Dibutyl sebacate is also used as a desensitizer in Otto fuel II, a torpedo monopropellant.

References

Carboxylate esters
Plasticizers